Relative Justice is an American arbitration-based reality court show presided over by Texas, California, and New York State licensed attorney Judge Rhonda Wills.

Relative Justice is produced by Wrigley Media Group, in association with Bloom 'N Apple Entertainment. It is executive produced by Misdee Wrigley Miller, Ross Babbit, Barry Bloom and court show veteran Lou Dennig (formerly of Judge Joe Brown). The show is distributed by David Bulhack of Big Fish Entertainment LLC.

The series focuses on inter-family legal disputes and premiered in first-run syndication on September 13, 2021.

References

2010s American reality television series
2020s American reality television series
2021 American television series debuts
Arbitration courts and tribunals
Court shows
English-language television shows
First-run syndicated television programs in the United States